Brooklyn is an unincorporated community in Susquehanna County, Pennsylvania, United States. Brooklyn has a post office with ZIP code 18813, which opened on March 20, 1830.

References

Unincorporated communities in Susquehanna County, Pennsylvania
Unincorporated communities in Pennsylvania